Zachary "Zack" Uriah Addy, Ph.D, is a fictional character in the television series Bones. He is portrayed by Eric Millegan. The character was introduced as Dr. Temperance Brennan's brilliant young assistant at the beginning of the series before he received his doctorate in forensic anthropology in Season 2. Millegan was a series regular for Seasons 1 to 3, appearing in all episodes. Since then, he has made guest appearances in Season 4's "The Perfect Pieces in the Purple Pond" and "The End in the Beginning" (dream sequence), Season 5's "The Parts in the Sum of the Whole" (flashback) and returned in the Season 11 finale "The Nightmare within the Nightmare", and had a recurring role in the series's final season. In the series penultimate episode "The Day in the Life", Zack is exonerated for the murder that left him incarcerated at the end of Season 3.

Character history 
Zack was the youngest in a large fictional family from Michigan, with three brothers and four sisters. Zack was a child prodigy, a genius with an I.Q. well above 163 with an eidetic memory. According to his character bio on the DVD for Season 1, Zack graduated from college at the age of 16.  It is revealed in the episode "The Boy in the Time Capsule" that Zack was physically bullied throughout high school. In "A Boy in a Tree," he is heard saying he "didn't have any friends" in high school and endured relentless physical and emotional abuse throughout his school life. Additionally, it is revealed that Zack is an excellent singer. At the beginning of the show, he had started two doctorates—one in Forensic Anthropology, the completion of which is shown on-screen in the episode "Judas on a Pole", and the other in Applied Engineering, the completion of which is referred to in "The Killer in the Concrete".

His specialty is in the analysis of remains, especially identifying causes of death and weapons from marks on skeletal remains. It is usually his task to remove the flesh from the bones, a process known as maceration. Because of his tremendous intellect, he has a broad-based knowledge of the specialties in the Jeffersonian lab.

Zack's best friend is Jack Hodgins. Although it at first appears Hodgins and Zack are roommates, it is later revealed he rents the apartment over Hodgins' garage. Zack also carpools with Hodgins because he can neither drive a car nor ride a bike. He once made a comment to Booth that if Booth shared Zack's knowledge of Structural Engineering, he would be afraid to drive as well (Season 1 "The Man on Death Row").  In The Man in the Bear, Zack and Hodgins compete for the affection of a beautiful delivery lady until they realize she shows an attraction to forensic artist Angela Montenegro.

Episodes towards the end of Season 1 reveal Zack's colleagues, especially Dr. Goodman, feel he has become comfortable as Dr. Brennan's assistant, and is therefore not completing his doctorate to avoid changing his position. Goodman and Hodgins conspire to make Zack less comfortable to motivate him to complete his studies, thus encouraging him to fulfill his potential of more than just an assistant.

Right before he was about to complete his doctorate, Zack asks the Jeffersonian's new forensics head, Dr. Camille Saroyan, if he can continue working at the Jeffersonian. She replies she could not put him in front of a court to testify because people would not take him seriously. Zack then goes to ask Angela for fashion advice, and she gives him a complete makeover that includes a new haircut and a suit. After completing his doctorate and getting the makeover from Angela, Zack again asks Cam for a job; she gives it to him, saying, "Who am I to break up the team?"

At the end of Season 2, Zack receives a request from the President's office to leave for Iraq. His reason for being there is kept confidential, which he only tells Hodgins and Booth about it. He is indecisive and asks Booth for advice as Booth "knows more about duty and honor than anyone else I know". Zack also turns down the offer to be the best man at Hodgins and Angela's wedding in case he is killed in Iraq, as he does not want Hodgins' memories of the wedding to be tainted with sadness. However, Zack is later seen at the wedding. It is revealed in Episode 1 of Season 3 that Zack had just returned from a three-month stint in Iraq, having returned early because he "failed to assimilate."

In "The Pain in the Heart", the final episode of Season 3, Zack receives third-degree burns and massive tissue damage on both hands after an explosion in the lab. It is later revealed he was working as the apprentice of the Gormogon, a cannibalistic serial killer, and the explosion was designed as a distraction so Gormogon could break into the lab and steal back the silver skeleton. Zack's weaker personality was easily manipulated by Gormogon so he believed his belief system irrefutable, even going as far as to divide the bones of a lobbyist among the 10,000 skeletons in the Jeffersonian's bone storage room, called Limbo. However, Zack still maintained loyalty to his friends. As pointed out by Brennan, he was willing to injure himself to keep Hodgins safe. He gives up the location of Gormogon's house after Brennan makes him realize his logic is faulty.

At the end of the episode, prosecutor Caroline Julian cuts Zack a deal. He pleaded guilty to killing the lobbyist and declared "Non compos mentis", thus committing him into a mental asylum rather than to prison.

Zack is no longer a regular character on the show, but series creator Hart Hanson said he may become a recurring character to provide consults to the team with "certain talents we can use in a 'Hannibal Lecter' kind of way."

The episode "The Perfect Pieces in the Purple Pond" reveals Zack is receiving psychological treatment from FBI psychologist Dr. Lance Sweets. It is also shown at least Hodgins and Angela have both been in contact with Zack during his confinement. Hodgins is shown bringing him a mathematical riddle to solve. In a session with Sweets, Zack admits to feeling guilty for killing the lobbyist but claims he was not actually crazy, arguing he committed the crime for what had appeared to be perfectly logical reasons at the time. "I was wrong, not delusional," he says. Sweets believes Zack should feel more guilty about killing the lobbyist and less about having been taken in by Gormogon's rhetoric.

Toward the end of the episode, Zack escapes from the institution. It is revealed he could have escaped at any time but did not feel it was necessary to do so until that particular moment. After helping his co-workers solve the case, he willingly returns to the institution with Sweets. While returning to the asylum, Zack tells Sweets that, although he helped Gormogon find the lobbyist, he himself had not actually stabbed him. In other words, Zack believes he killed the lobbyist, but, from a legal standpoint, he is considered only an accessory or co-conspirator. Sweets insists Zack change his story, but Zack refuses. He fears, if his secret were to come out, he will find himself in prison, where he is sure to do very poorly. He reminds Sweets, as Zack's therapist, he must not reveal his secret because he would be violating doctor-patient confidentiality. The episode closes with Zack behind bars at the institution, and Sweets keeping his secret.

In the Season 4 finale, Zack is considered a suspect when a man is murdered in a popular nightclub owned by Booth and Brennan. Zack is described by Vincent Nigel-Murray as "the type of moron who goes to jail for a murder he didn't commit", suggesting that, on some level, Booth knows Zack is innocent. At the end of the episode, it is shown that the entire thing was in fact a dream about an alternate timeline that Booth had while unconscious and part of a new book Brennan was writing.

Zack also returned in the 100th episode as a flashback to Booth and Brennan's first case together.

Later on, Hodgins says that Zack will be in the asylum "forever", hinting that Zack would be in the asylum on a permanent basis and would never be released to the general public. Also, in the episode "The He in the She", Hodgins tells Vincent that Zack would be locked up for the rest of his life.

After eight years from being absent from the show, Zack is mentioned in season 11 "The Movie in the Making." The episode was a "mockumentary" on The Jeffersonian and its partnership with the FBI. When the film crew begins asking Hodgins about Zack, Hodgins becomes visibly shaken.

In "The Monster in the Closet", a serial killer has been discovered and named The Puppeteer, due to the nature of the crimes and how the killer would hang the victims from wires and use them as puppets. The following episode, "The Nightmare Within the Nightmare", which is the season 11 finale, a desiccated body is discovered in an abandoned warehouse. The clothes that the victim is dressed in are the same clothes that Dr. Brennan had donated a few months earlier. A mixtape is left with the body and the songs on the tape are from a songbook printed in Michigan. Over the past few weeks, Dr. Brennan has been having vivid nightmares about a burned attacker; in one dream, Wendell brings Brennan her coffee, and his hands are severely burned. Dr. Brennan begins to break down and sees a therapist to help interpret her dreams. The therapist makes Brennan realize that the attacker is someone she knows but doesn't want to accept who it is.

After coming back to the lab, Brennan calls the team because everyone has left. The team, waiting for her at a nearby pub, tells her they left because of an email supposedly sent out by Dr. Brennan. It is soon revealed that the email was sent by The Puppeteer. While on the phone with the team, The Puppeteer comes into the room and disconnects Brennan's call. Booth takes the therapist's notes from Brennan's sessions to piece together the puzzle. Back at the lab, the team goes over all the clues about The Puppeteer. They realize that the dreams about Wendell is a symbol of someone who used to work at the lab. The team becomes silent as they realize who it is; Cam states, "Oh no, it can't be." Booth then races to the hospital where Zack is staying and discovers that Zack has escaped. Later on, as Brennan wakes up, she asks, "Zack?" Zack says, "Dr. Brennan, it is good to see you again. You and I, we have so much to talk about."

The Season 12 premiere of Bones solves the mystery about Zack. He has taken Brennan to the old vault of the Gormogon, which is in the basement of the Jeffersonian, with the intention of protecting her from The Puppeteer and to reveal the truth about himself. Booth captures Zack and he is taken into custody. It is revealed that after the death of Lance Sweets, Zack harmed himself, leaving a large scar on his forehead and occasional blackouts from minor brain damage. After being allowed to consult the evidence files of the Puppeteer case with Brennan, he concludes that, while blacked out, he committed the crimes, and wishes to return to the mental institution that is his home. In a surprise turn of events, the team at the Jeffersonian find out that it is Zack's doctor from the institution, Dr. Mihir Roshan, that has been committing the murders and arranging the skeleton marionettes.

Dr. Roshan intended to poison Zack, and Booth arrives at the institution in time to save him. While Zack was able to overpower Roshan, he was unable to find the strength to kill him. Booth shoots Roshan, and Zack survives. He concludes he could not have committed murder under the order of Gormogon, and confesses his innocence to Brennan and Booth. This convinces them to re-examine the evidence, and the episode ends with the idea that Zack may become free of the institution in the future.

In "The Flaw in the Saw", Hodgins works to find evidence to exonerate Zack. Although he finds evidence, Cam fears that Hodgins is planting it to free Zack and refuses to consider it. However, Cam eventually decides to go through Hodgins' evidence. In "The Steal in the Wheels", the Jeffersonian team is able to locate the body of the Gormogon's former apprentice, the true killer, and match the blood on it to the lobbyist Zack supposedly killed. In "The Day in the Life", Zack goes before a judge for his appeal. Based on this new evidence, Zack is acquitted of the murder charge but not of aiding a known killer. As a result, he will have to finish the remaining thirteen months on his sentence. While Brennan is sorry they couldn't get him released, Zack accepts this as thirteen months is nothing compared to the life sentence he was originally facing.

Characterization
Despite his intelligence, Zack is characterized as being unsure of himself, though he has provided crucial insights to some of the team's cases. He is unable to forcefully express his opinion to Dr. Brennan, possibly due to romantic feelings toward her. When he discovered Temperance's own Forensic Anthropology professor had become her lover, Zack repeatedly wondered aloud whether he might enter into a similar relationship with Dr. Brennan. His colleagues quickly dismissed this idea as nonsense. Zack appears to have an on and off-again relationship with "Naomi in Paleontology". In the third season, they accompany each other to the annual Jeffersonian Institute Halloween party, and he mentions her again in "The Parts in the Sum of the Whole".

Although well-meaning, helpful, and friendly, when a situation calls for social interaction or intuition, he is often lost. Zack has no problem making inappropriate comments about others' personal lives and has asked Agent Booth for advice on sex and women. At one point, Booth threatened to shoot Zack "between the eyes" if he continued to ask him those questions. He also asked Angela for advice, on one occasion even recommending him to "reap the benefits of [her] sexual wisdom", and Hodgins gave him a pocket-sized Kama Sutra to help him out. Further evidence of his social ineptitude can be seen in the frequent, on-screen coaching in social matters he gets from Jack and Angela.  He is very literal-minded, and is often confused by colloquial expressions or metaphor, despite his high intelligence. His attempts to use such expressions are met with mixed success, such as referring to a skull he'd cleaned as being "clean enough to eat off of". His inability to pick up on pop culture references or jokes was often a source of comedy in the show. Other characters, especially Booth and Hodgins, were often annoyed or turned off by his lack of social skills. Hodgins once called him a "dull Vulcan" in exasperation.

In the episode "The Killer in the Concrete",  Booth is on the phone with Zack and Dr. Brennan while looking for "Icepick" at a model airplane enthusiasts gathering.  Unaware of Zack's interest in planes, Booth comments every "airplane freak" in the area was at the event, and Zack corrects him by saying the enthusiasts prefer to be called "pilots." Zack mentions forensic anthropology is only one of his areas of study; he received a masters in applied engineering, and he is extremely adept in practical aeronautics.

Even in the asylum, Zack apparently still has some degree of contact with his old colleagues. Hodgins occasionally visits him with puzzles for him to solve and Sweets becomes his therapist. The season 11 finale implied that Booth also may have had some contact with Zack in the seasons following his departure, as he knows an orderly at the institution where he is located, and knows exactly where his room is.

References

Bones (TV series) characters
Fictional anthropologists
Fictional characters from Michigan
Television characters introduced in 2005
American male characters in television